The Christian Reformed Churches in the Netherlands is a Protestant church in the Netherlands.

History 
The original name of the church was Christian Reformed Church in the Netherlands (Christelijke Gereformeerde Kerk in Nederland, CGKN). The church was formed in 1869 by the merger of two churches, the Reformed Churches under the Cross and the Separated Christian Congregations, both separated from the Dutch Reformed Church in 1834; an event known as the Afscheiding. Most of the CGKN merged into the Reformed Churches in the Netherlands in 1892; a small part remained independent, and carried this name until it was renamed in 1947 to Christian Reformed Churches.

At the first Synod eight congregations were represented. A Theological Seminary was opened in The Hague and later was moved to Apeldoorn in 1919. Since then the churches grew steadily till 1985, when membership was 75,000, and today membership fluctuates around this number. It has 11 classes. The church withdrew from the Reformed Ecumenical Council in 1989, and joined the International Conference of Reformed Churches in 1995.

It has a theological institute in Apeldoorn, the Theological University of Apeldoorn. It offers the Bachelor of Theology and the Master of Divinity.

Developments 

Several congregations for example in Rotterdam and in Zwartsluis dissolved or merged with the Reformed Churches in the Netherlands (Liberated) like in Doesburg. In 2012, many Christian Reformed missions were constituted as full-fledged congregations. On 1nJanuary 2013, the denomination had 33 more members than in their previous years.

Theology 
The church subscribe to the infallibility of the Bible, to the Nicene Creed, the Apostles' Creed, the Athanasian Creed and the Three Forms of Unity (the Heidelberg Catechism, the Belgic Confession and the Canons of Dort).

Statistics 
In January 2012, the church has 74,286 members in 181 churches. In recent years membership was steady. In the next year in early 2013 membership grew by more than 30.

Interchurch relations 
The Christian Reformed Churches in the Netherlands seek cooperation with the Reformed Churches in the Netherlands (Liberated) and with other Dutch Reformed Churches. It supports missions in Thailand, and Sulawesi, Indonesia, the Toraja Mamasa Church was founded by missionaries of the Christian Reformed denomination. 
Complete correspondence:
Free Reformed Churches in North America
Free Church of Scotland
Free Church of Scotland (Continuing)
Reformed Presbyterian Church of Ireland
Reformed Churches in South Africa
Igrejas Evangelicas Reformadas do Brasil
Reformed Churches of New Zealand

Limited Correspondence:
Dutch Reformed Church in Botswana
Reformed Churches of Botswana
Orthodox Presbyterian Church
Reformed Church in Japan
Presbyterian Church in Korea (Koshin)
Christian Reformed Churches of Australia

See also

Free Reformed Churches of North America, the North American affiliate of the Christian Reformed Churches
Christian Reformed Church in North America, a denomination not affiliated with the Christian Reformed Churches  but having a coincidentally similar name in North America.

References

External links 
  (Dutch)
Brief description of CGKN in English

Christian denominations in the Netherlands
Religious organizations established in 1869
Reformed denominations in the Netherlands
1869 establishments in the Netherlands